The structure of the United States Air Force refers to the unit designators and organizational hierarchy of the United States Air Force, which starts at the most senior commands.

The senior headquarters of the Department of the Air Force consists of two staffs in the Pentagon: the Secretariat or SAF Staff and the Headquarters Air Force or HAF Staff. The Secretariat is headed by the Secretary of the Air Force (SECAF) and HAF Staff is headed by the Chief of Staff of the Air Force (CSAF).

Organizational types

Direct Reporting Unit
A Direct Reporting Unit (DRU) is an agency of the United States Department of the Air Force that is outside the bounds of the standard organizational hierarchy by being exclusively and uniquely under the control of Air Force headquarters alone, rather than reporting through a major command. The term "direct reporting unit" comes from the fact that the unit reports directly to the Chief of Staff of the Air Force or to a designated representative on the Air staff.

A DRU has a specialized and restricted mission, meaning that it is a single purpose unit, usually to the exclusion of other duties, reporting to Air Force Air Staff alone. It is separate and independent from any organization structure or supervision: major command, numbered air force, operational command, division, wing, group, squadron, or field operating agency. It is a DRU because the unit's specific and focused duties, legal issues that necessitate the unit's independence, or other factors such as national security concerns.

The Air Force has a very limited number of direct reporting units:

Field operating agency

The field operating agency (FOA) is a subdivision of the Air Force, directly subordinate to an HQ USAF functional manager. A FOA performs field activities beyond the scope of any of the major commands. The activities are specialized or associated with an Air Force-wide mission, and do not include functions performed in management headquarters, unless specifically directed by a DoD authority.

Major Command (MAJCOM)

A major subdivision of the Air Force, the major command (MAJCOM) is directly subordinate to HQ USAF or the Air Staff. MAJCOM headquarters are management headquarters for a major segment of the AF and thus have the full range of functional staff. MAJCOMs are commanded by a general (O-10).

Numbered Air Force (NAF)

The numbered air force (NAF) is a tactical echelon directly under an operational MAJCOM that provide operational leadership and supervision. NAFs are structured to perform an operational or warfighting mission, often oriented to a specific geographic region. A NAF is directly assigned operational units, such as wings, groups, and squadrons. NAFs are commanded by either a major general (O-8) or lieutenant general (O-9).

Wing

Wings have a distinct mission with a specific scope, reporting to the NAF or HQ USAF. Wings are made up of one or more groups, consisting of several squadrons, and usually commanded by a colonel (O-6), but high visibility wings can have a brigadier general (O-7) in command. Second in command to the Wing Commander is the Deputy Wing Commander who is and only can be a colonel. The senior enlisted personnel of a wing can be known as the Command Chief who holds the rank of command chief master sergeant (E-9). Wings now encompass both operations and support activities (maintenance groups, mission support groups), and are usually one of three major types: operational wing, air base wing, and specialized mission wing. As of 30 September 2006 USAF had 120 wings, including 57 flying (manned aircraft) wings.

Group

Made up of several squadrons and typically commanded by a colonel (O-6). Second in command to the Group Commander is the Deputy Group Commander who is also a colonel or lieutenant colonel (O-5). The senior enlisted personnel of a group is known as the Group Senior Enlisted Leader (formerly Group Superintendent). This position can only be held by a chief master sergeant (E-9). The group was of less visibility for some decades but came back to prominence during a transition to the "objective wing" organization in the 1990s. This reorganization changed the base command structure from the "wing commander/base commander" scheme to a single wing commander ("one base-one boss") with multiple groups under his command. There are two general types of groups: dependent (operations, logistics, support, medical, or large functional unit); and independent (a group with wing-like functions and responsibilities whose scope and size does not warrant wing-level designation). As of 30 September 2006, USAF had 17 independent groups, nine of them flying establishments.

Squadron

The squadron is considered to be the basic unit in the USAF. Squadrons are usually made up of two to six flights and may contain from a few dozen up to a few hundred people, depending upon type. (An operational, or "flying," squadron will typically contain aircrew, organized in three or four flights, sufficient to man from eight to 24 aircraft, dependent upon the type/model/series of aircraft operated. The aircraft are "owned" by the squadron's parent wing's maintenance group, while the operational squadrons and their aircrews belong to the wing's operations group.)

A squadron is usually commanded by a major (O-4) or lieutenant colonel (O-5), however lieutenant colonel is the most common grade of rank for the "squadron commander" (SQ/CC) of most types of squadrons. Second in command to the squadron commander (SQ/CC) is the squadron "operations officer" or director of operations (DO), who is usually a senior major. The DO is assisted by one or two "assistant operations officers," who are normally majors or senior captains. The squadron's flights are commanded by officers (majors and below) who have the title of "flight commander" (Flt/CC).

The remaining captains and lieutenants in operational squadrons (who are also aircraft pilots, combat systems officers, and air battle managers) are assigned as heads or assistant heads of various "functional areas" (often referred to as "shops") within either the "operations" (reporting to the squadron DO) or the "administrative" functional areas (reporting to the SQ/CC of the squadron). "Administrative" functional areas may include: "administration" (personnel records and manpower management), "secretary" (often a civilian employee), "executive officer" (officer personal assistant to the SQ/CC); and "awards and decorations." While under "Operations" there are usually: "command, control, communications, and computers" (C4), "schedules," "training," "weapons/tactics," "mobility/plans," and "Aviation Resources Management" (i.e., flight records). In addition, there are "safety" and "standardization/evaluation" functional areas that report directly to the SQ/CC.

Air Force squadrons also contain noncommissioned officer (NCO)/senior NCO (SNCO) leadership who directly supervise the squadron's enlisted Airmen. The SQ/CC is assisted by a "first sergeant" (i.e., a specially selected and trained master, senior, or chief master sergeant in pay grades "E-7," "E-8," or "E-9," respectively). The first sergeant serves as the SQ/CCs "senior enlisted advisor" for enlisted morale, welfare, and conduct matters. Officers serving as Flt/CCs may be assisted by NCOs/SNCOs (technical and master sergeants, "E-6" and "E-7," respectively) with the title of "flight chief," who are second-line supervisors over more junior NCOs and Airmen within the flight. Flights are then further sub-divided into a number of elements with NCOs (staff sergeants, pay grade "E-5") assigned as "element leaders" functioning as first-line supervisors to the Airmen in their elements. Some squadrons (typically in the wing's maintenance group or mission support group) have functional areas led by SNCOs with the title of "superintendents" (this title is changing to "senior enlisted leaders" on 10/01/2121). These are senior and chief master sergeants (E-8s and E-9s) serving as "subject matter experts" in various technical areas who also provide SNCO leadership to NCOs and Airmen under their supervision.

Flight
A flight is the smallest official capacity in the Air Force and usually ranges from a dozen people to over a hundred, or typically four aircraft. The flight commander or OIC is a company-grade officer which can be described as a 2nd lieutenant (O-1), 1st lieutenant (O-2), or captain (O-3). Second in command to the flight commander is an SNCO typically being a master sergeant (E-7). Phonetic letter designations can be used to distinguish each flight, such as alpha flight, bravo flight, etc.

Element/squad
Although not officially recognized, an element is generally understood to be the smallest unit in the Air Force. Typically, a flight is broken up into 3–4 evenly distributed elements. The element leader is an NCO which can be described as a staff sergeant (E-5) or technical sergeant (E-6).

Historical organizations

Separate operating agency
(not in current use)

Separate operating agencies (SOA) were major Air Force subdivisions directly subordinate to HQ USAF and has all the "procedural (administrative and logistical) responsibilities" of a MAJCOM. In 1991, most active SOAs changed in status to DRUs or FOAs.

Air division

Air divisions have existed since World War II when many of the Numbered Air Divisions began as wings. There were both named and numbered divisions, mostly air divisions. Recently HQ USAF gradually inactivated or redesignated divisions in an effort to encourage rapid decision-making and to create a more flat organizational structure without "middle management" units, and as such air divisions are rarely used.

Reserve components and auxiliary

Air National Guard

The Air National Guard, often referred to as the Air Guard, is the air force militia organized by each of the fifty U.S. states, the commonwealth of Puerto Rico, the territories of Guam and the U.S. Virgin Islands, and the District of Columbia of the United States. Established under Title 10 and Title 32 of the U.S. Code, the Air National Guard is part of a state's National Guard and is divided up into units stationed in each of the 50 states and U.S. territories and operates under their respective state governor or territorial government. The Air National Guard may be called up for active duty by the state governors or territorial commanding generals to help respond to domestic emergencies and disasters, such as those caused by hurricanes, floods, and earthquakes.

With the consent of state governors, members or units of the Air National Guard may be appointed, temporarily or indefinitely, to be federally recognized members of the armed forces, in the active or inactive service of the United States. If federally recognized, the member or unit becomes part of the Air National Guard of the United States, which is one of two reserve components of the United States Air Force, and part of the National Guard of the United States. Air National Guard of the United States units or members may be called up for federal active duty in times of congressionally sanctioned war or national emergency.

United States Air Force Reserve

CONUS based AFRC units are assigned to AFRC. This assignment governs command relationships within the Air Force chain of command. 10 USC § 10174 states:

(a)	Establishment of Command.— The Secretary of the Air Force, with the advice and assistance of the Chief of Staff of the Air Force, shall establish an Air Force Reserve Command. The Air Force Reserve Command shall be operated as a separate command of the Air Force.
 
(b)	Commander.— The Chief of Air Force Reserve is the Commander of the Air Force Reserve Command. The commander of the Air Force Reserve Command reports directly to the Chief of Staff of the Air Force.

(c)	Assignment of Forces.— The Secretary of the Air Force—

(1)	 shall assign to the Air Force Reserve Command all forces of the Air Force Reserve stationed in the continental United States other than forces assigned to the unified combatant command for special operations forces established pursuant to section 167 of this title; and

(2)	 except as otherwise directed by the Secretary of Defense in the case of forces assigned to carry out functions of the Secretary of the Air Force specified in section 8013 of this title, shall assign to the combatant commands all such forces assigned to the Air Force Reserve Command under paragraph (1) in the manner specified by the Secretary of Defense.

Civil Air Patrol

Civil Air Patrol (CAP) is a congressionally chartered, federally supported, non-profit corporation that serves as the official auxiliary of the USAF. It performs three congressionally assigned key missions: emergency services, which includes search and rescue (by air and ground) and disaster relief operations; aerospace education for youth and the general public; and cadet programs for teenage youth. In addition, CAP has recently been tasked with homeland security and courier service missions. CAP also performs non-auxiliary missions for various governmental and private agencies, such as local law enforcement and the American Red Cross. The program is established as an organization by Title 10 of the United States Code and its purposes defined by Title 36. When conducting missions for the Air Force as the official Air Force auxiliary, CAP is now included in the Air Force's definition of the total force.

Other generic designations

In addition to the aforementioned unit structures, the USAF has used, and still uses, a variety of other designations to identify organizations. These organization designations include:

 Academy
 Agency
 Area
 Band
 Battlelab
 Branch
 Center
 Central
 Clinic
 College
 Crew

 Depository
 Depot
 Detachment
 Directorate 
 Dispensary
 Division
 District
 Element
 Facility
 Fire team
 Hospital
 Infirmary

 Institute
 Laboratory
 Library
 Museum
 Office
 Operating Location
 Organization
 Plant
 Range
 Region

 School
 Section
 Sector
 Squad
 Staff
 System
 Team
 Unit
 University

Notes

References

External links
  Airman magazine Web Edition copyright notice: https://web.archive.org/web/20090517081401/http://www.af.mil/news/airman/notice.shtml

 
United States Air Force